In Search of the Dark Ages is a BBC television documentary series, written and presented by historian Michael Wood, first shown between 1979 and 1981. It comprises eight short films across two series, each focusing on a particular character from the history of England prior to the Norman Conquest, a period popularly known as the Dark Ages. It is also the title of a book written by Wood to support the series, that was first published in 1981.

Overview
The series was made by BBC Manchester and narrated by Wood, who was at that time a lecturer (and, eventually, Professor of History) at Manchester University. It consists of eight separate programmes, and the collective title is often written as In Search of... The Dark Ages (originally it was known simply as In Search of...). Each programme, except the finale, ran between 35 and 45 minutes. It began with a one-off pilot programme called In Search of Offa, filmed in 1978, and first broadcast in January 1979. When its reception was regarded as favourable, three further programmes were filmed in 1979. The series first aired on BBC Two in March 1980, beginning with Boadicea and including a repeat showing of the original Offa programme. The series was so well received that a second series was soon commissioned.

The programmes were filmed entirely on location with no studio-based scenes. Wood's concept was that the entire production should occur in the actual places associated with the historical events on which he was reporting. The films were mostly composed of visits to battlefields, cathedrals and other early medieval sites in England to view the actual places where the great events of history occurred. This "popular and serious style of history programming" was becoming increasingly prevalent at that time. The effect was enhanced by Wood often appearing on-screen, instead of being merely a voice-over, thereby giving the viewer an impression of journalistic immediacy.

Season 1

Season 2

Reception
The series made the reputation of Wood, and launched his broadcasting career. Its success has been attributed in part to his "down-to-earth and friendly style" (at the time of its first broadcast, Wood was not yet a practising academic), and in part to the romantic and legendary, sometimes semi-mythical, subject matter. Wood attempted to penetrate beyond popular myths surrounding a chosen figure, to uncover their real historical character. As The Times television reviewer remarked, Wood is "never at a loss for a striking analogy". At a time when documentaries were often the exclusive preserve of academics, Wood's youth, fashion, and enthusiasm were regarded as being the key to the success of the series.

Repeats of the two series continued to air until 1984, however, it was not possible to include the first programme, about Offa, in the re-runs which aired in 1984, as that programme had already had two repeats by then (which was, at the time, the most that was permitted under the BBC's contractual arrangements with the broadcasting unions). While remaining an Anglo-Saxon specialist, Woods subsequently branched out into other aspects of history, including In Search of the Trojan War (1985), In Search of Shakespeare (2003), and In Search of Myths and Heroes (2005), returning to an Anglo-Saxon theme with In Search of Beowulf (2009).

Home media
A double DVD set was released in 2015:
Running time	352 minutes
Certification	E
Languages	English
Region	2
Subtitles	No
Format	DVD
Release Date	02/02/2015
Distributor	Simply Home Entertainment
Number of Discs	2
Label	Simply Media
RRP	24.99
Country of Origin	United Kingdom
Main Category	Special Interest
Sub Category	Documentary/Historical

Book
Wood's accompanying book based on the series, entitled In Search of The Dark Ages (BBC Books, 1981), was published to coincide with the BBC's showing of the second series, with the book release occurring on 19 March 1981, the same day on which the first programme was transmitted. New editions were published in 1987, 1994, 2001, 2005 and 2015.

As well as the eight subjects of the television series, the book includes a ninth chapter on the Sutton Hoo man which was not made into a TV episode. An edition published for the Folio Society in 2022 includes further chapters on King Penda and Æthelflæd Lady of the Mercians. The book was described by the TLS as "a splendidt back-up book for 'A'Level historians".

Contemporary reviews of the book included comments such as: "Wood's carefully researched foray into early medieval Britain sifts a number of unresolved mysteries" (Publishers Weekly). The book's popularity was such that it eventually ran to four editions, published between 1981 and 1987. It has endeavoured to avoid the fate of the television series, with Wood subsequently revising the book to include recent discoveries; and it remains currently available in the Revised Edition (published in 2001).

References

Television series about the history of England
English-language television shows
1979 British television series debuts
1981 British television series endings
1970s British documentary television series
1980s British documentary television series
BBC television documentaries about medieval history
BBC television documentaries about prehistoric and ancient history